Chorthippus jucundus is a species of slant-faced grasshopper in the family Acrididae.	It is found in Europe.

References

Further reading

External links

 

jucundus